Saran is a trade name used by S.C. Johnson & Son, Inc. for a polyethylene food wrap.  The Saran trade name was first owned by Dow Chemical for polyvinylidene chloride (PVDC), along with other monomers. The formulation was changed to the less effective polyethylene in 2004 due to the chlorine content of PVDC.

Since its accidental discovery in 1933, polyvinylidene chloride has been used for a number of commercial and industrial products.  When formed into a thin plastic film, the principal advantages of polyvinylidene chloride, when compared to other plastics, are its ability to adhere to itself and its very low permeability to water vapor, flavor and aroma molecules, and oxygen. This oxygen barrier prevents food spoilage, while the film barrier to flavor and aroma molecules helps food retain its flavor and aroma.

History

Polyvinylidene chloride (PVDC) was discovered at Dow Chemical Company (Michigan, United States) in 1933 when a lab worker, Ralph Wiley, was having trouble washing beakers used in his process of developing a dry-cleaning product.  It was initially developed into a spray that was used on US fighter planes and, later, automobile upholstery, to protect them from the elements.  Dow Chemical later named the product Saran and eliminated its green hue and offensive odor.

In 1942, fused layers of original-specification PVDC were used to make woven mesh ventilating insoles for newly developed jungle or tropical combat boots made of rubber and canvas.  These insoles were tested by experimental Army units in jungle exercises in Panama, Venezuela, and other countries, where they were found to increase the flow of dry outside air to the insole and base of the foot, reducing blisters and tropical ulcers.  The PVDC ventilating mesh insole was later adopted by the United States Army for standard issue in its M-1945 and M-1966 Jungle Boots. In 1943, Ralph Wiley and his boss, John Reilly, both employed by Dow Chemical Company, completed the final work needed for the introduction of PVDC, which had been invented in 1939. PVDC monofilaments were also extruded for the first time. The word Saran was formed from a combination of John Reilly's wife's and daughter's names, Sarah and Ann Reilly.

In 1949, Dow introduced Saran Wrap, a thin, clingy plastic wrap that was sold in rolls and used primarily for wrapping food.  It quickly became popular for preserving food items stored in the refrigerator.  Saran Wrap was later acquired by S. C. Johnson & Son.

After the end of the Vietnam War, the U.S. military phased out PVDC insoles in favor of Poron®, a microcellular urethane, for its jungle and combat boots.  However, the British Army continues to use PVDC insoles in its combat boots, primarily because of its insulating properties.

Formulation change to polyethylene
Today's Saran Wrap is no longer composed of PVDC in the United States, due to cost, processing difficulties, and environmental concerns with halogenated materials, and is now made from polyethylene. However, polyethylene has a higher oxygen permeability, which in turn affects food spoilage prevention.  For example, at 23 °C and 95% relative humidity polyvinylidene chloride has an oxygen permeability of 0.6 cm3 μm m−2 d−1 kPa−1 while low-density polyethylene under the same conditions has an oxygen permeability of 2000 cm3 μm m−2 d−1 kPa−1, or a factor of over 3,000 times more permeable.  For that reason, packaging for the meat industry still may use PVDC-containing films, as a barrier layer.

References

External links
 
 "Saran Wrap - The History of PVDC" (from About.com)

Plastics
Packaging materials
Food preparation utensils
Synthetic fibers
Kitchenware brands
S. C. Johnson & Son brands
Dow Chemical Company
Brand name materials
Products introduced in 1933